Risøysundet is a strait between the islands of Andøya and Hinnøya in the Vesterålen archipelago in Norway. It is located in Andøy Municipality in Nordland county.

The strait flows between the Gavlfjorden/Sortlandssundet in the southwest and the Andfjorden in the northeast. The northeastern end of the strait is naturally very shallow and in low tide the sand bars can be above water. In the 1870s work began to dredge a channel through the strait to allow larger boats to pass.

References

Andøy
Vesterålen
Straits of Norway
Ramsar sites in Norway